Sideritis romana, the simplebeak ironwort, is a species of shrub in the family Lamiaceae. They have a self-supporting growth form and simple, broad leaves. Flowers are visited by European wool carder bee, Rhodanthidium septemdentatum, Amegilla, and Osmia andrenoides. Individuals can grow to 0.15 m.

Sources

References 

romana
Flora of Malta